Gabriel Calvo (5 August 1955 – 10 December 2021) was a Spanish gymnast. He competed at the 1976 Summer Olympics and the 1980 Summer Olympics.

Calvo died in Granada on 10 December 2021, at the age of 66.

References

External links
 

1955 births
2021 deaths
Gymnasts at the 1976 Summer Olympics
Gymnasts at the 1980 Summer Olympics
Gymnasts from Madrid
Olympic gymnasts of Spain
Spanish male artistic gymnasts
20th-century Spanish people
21st-century Spanish people